To Kwa Wan North is one of the 22 constituencies of the Kowloon City District Council. The seat elects one member of the council every four years. The seat has continuously been held by Starry Lee since 1999. The boundary is loosely based on the Northern area of To Kwa Wan.

Councillors represented

1982 to 1985

1985 to 1991

1999 to present

Election results

2010s

2000s

1990s

1980s

Citations

References
2011 District Council Election Results (Kowloon City)
2007 District Council Election Results (Kowloon City)
2003 District Council Election Results (Kowloon City)
1999 District Council Election Results (Kowloon City)

Constituencies of Hong Kong
Constituencies of Kowloon City District Council
1982 establishments in Hong Kong
1991 disestablishments in Hong Kong
Constituencies established in 1982
Constituencies disestablished in 1991
1999 establishments in Hong Kong
Constituencies established in 1999